Ničpur is a village in the municipality of Mavrovo and Rostuša, North Macedonia.

Demographics
As of the 2021 census, Ničpur had 5 residents with the following ethnic composition:
Albanians 5

According to the 2002 census, the village had a total of 13 inhabitants. Ethnic groups in the village include:

Albanians 12
Macedonians 1

References

Villages in Mavrovo and Rostuša Municipality
Albanian communities in North Macedonia